is a Japanese football manager and former player. He played for the Japan national team.

Club career
Yamaguchi was born in Takasaki on January 29, 1969. After graduating from Tokai University, he joined All Nippon Airways (later Yokohama Flügels) in 1991. The club won 1993 Emperor's Cup their first time in major title. In Asia, the club also won 1994–95 Asian Cup Winners' Cup. In 1998, the club won Emperor's Cup. However the club was disbanded end of 1998 season due to financial strain, he moved to Nagoya Grampus Eight with Seigo Narazaki in 1999. The club won 1999 Emperor's Cup. He moved to J2 League club Albirex Niigata in 2003. The club won the champions in 2003 and was promoted to J1 League. In August 2005, he moved to J2 League club Yokohama FC was founded by Yokohama Flügels supporters. The club won the champions in 2006 and was promoted to J1 League. He retired end of 2007 season. He also served as captain in all teams.

International career
In January 1995, Yamagugchi was selected by the Japan national team for the 1995 King Fahd Cup. At this competition, on January 6, he debuted against Nigeria. After his debut, he became a regular player and he played most matches for Japan until the 1998 FIFA World Cup. In 1996, he played full time in all matches at 1996 AFC Asian Cup. In the 1998 FIFA World Cup qualification in 1997, he played all matches and Japan won the qualify for 1998 World Cup first time Japan's history. At the 1998 FIFA World Cup, he played full time in all three matches. These were his last appearances for Japan. He played 58 games and scored 4 goals for Japan until 1998.

Coaching career
After retirement, Yamaguchi became a manager for Yokohama FC as Yasuyuki Kishino successor in March 2012. He managed the club until 2014

Career statistics

Club

International

Scores and results list Japan's goal tally first, score column indicates score after each Yamaguchi goal.

Managerial statistics

Honors
Yokohama Flügels
 Emperor's Cup: 1993, 1998
 Asian Super Cup: 1995
Nagoya Grampus Eight	
Emperor's Cup: 1999
Albirex Niigata
J2 League: 2003

Individual
 J1 League Best Eleven: 1996, 1997

References

External links
 
 
 Japan National Football Team Database
 
 

1969 births
Living people
Tokai University alumni
Association football people from Gunma Prefecture
Japanese footballers
Japan international footballers
Japan Soccer League players
J1 League players
J2 League players
Yokohama Flügels players
Nagoya Grampus players
Albirex Niigata players
Yokohama FC players
1995 King Fahd Cup players
1996 AFC Asian Cup players
1998 FIFA World Cup players
Japanese football managers
J2 League managers
Yokohama FC managers
Association football midfielders